Yves Van Geertsom, known professionally as Yves V or Eefee, is a Belgian DJ and record producer. In 2019, he was voted in at number 56 in the DJ Mag Top 100.

Career 
Yves V has performed at festivals such as TomorrowWorld, Sensation, mystic valley and Mysteryland. Yves V has also been guest DJ in well-known clubs such as Guaba, Pacha, Anzu Club, Nikki Beach and many others in Indonesia, Malaysia, Brasil, Cyprus, Spain, France, Finland, Italy, Greece and his native country Belgium.

Yves V broke through with his remix "Insane Pressure" in 2009. His tracks appeal to a broad audience and evolved from underground trance to Beatport Top 100 hits. He collaborated with major artists: "Madagascar" with Dimitri Vegas & Like Mike & Angger Dimas, "Cloudbreaker" with Basto!, "Momentum" with Regi, "Old Skool Sound" with Chuckie and "Direct Dizko" with Sander van Doorn. His remixes also put his stamp on Hiphop artists such as Timbaland, Missy Elliott and Ginuwine.

In 2014, "Wait Till Tomorrow" with Regi featuring Mitch Crown became a big summer hit.  Yves V released his newest single "Octagon" on record label Smash The House in Autumn 2015.

On June 14, 2019, Yves V,  Afrojack and Icona Pop released the collaborative single "We Got That Cool". The song samples the "Strip to the Bone" remix of Crystal Waters' 1991 single "Gypsy Woman (She's Homeless)". In the United States, the single reached number four on Billboard's Dance/Mix Show Airplay chart in November 2019.

DJ Mag Top 100 

In 2015, Yves V took the 34th position in DJ Mag Top 100, the annual DJ world ranking. Besides Dimitri Vegas & Like Mike he was the first Belgian to be in the top forty. In the following years he ranked number 62 in 2016, number 55 in 2017 in DJ Mag's Top 100 DJs poll.

Tomorrowland 

Together with the Belgian-Greek DJ-duo Dimitri Vegas & Like Mike Yves-V is resident DJ at the Belgian festival Tomorrowland. In 2007, he was the first Belgian DJ to climb the mainstage and was scheduled amongst stars such as David Guetta and Armin van Buuren.  Since his first gig at Tomorrowland he has performed 8 times at its mainstage. Next to Tomorrowland, Yves V is also official resident DJ at TomorrowWorld in Atlanta (United States) and Itu (Brasil).  He also collaborated in the making of the official Tomorrowland CD. The three-CD exclusive compilation included a personally curated mix from Yves V.

Since 2012 Yves V hosts his V-Sessions stage at Tomorrowland. Eric Prydz, Nicky Romero, AN21 & Max Vangeli, Sultan & Ned Shepard and Pete Tong were invited to his stage.

Discography

Extended plays

Singles

Remixes

References

External links
Official website

1981 births
Living people
Belgian DJs
Belgian house musicians